Berit Jóhannesson (born May 22, 1946 in Gothenburg) is a Swedish Left Party politician. She was a member of the Riksdag from 1998 to 2006.

External links
Berit Jóhannesson at the Riksdag website

1946 births
21st-century Swedish women politicians
Living people
Members of the Riksdag 1998–2002
Members of the Riksdag 2002–2006
Members of the Riksdag from the Left Party (Sweden)
People from Gothenburg
Women members of the Riksdag